Gabriela del Socorro Álvarez García (died 2017) was a Mexican mechanical engineer known for her research on solar energy and heat transfer in buildings and on the use of reflective building roofs to reduce the need for air conditioning.

Education and career
Álvarez is originally from Mexico City, and as an undergraduate studied physics at the National Autonomous University of Mexico (UNAM). After earning a master's degree in mechanical engineering from New Mexico State University in the US, she returned to UNAM for doctoral study in engineering. She completed her doctorate in 1994 with the dissertation Transferencia de calor en una cavidad con interaccion termica a traves de una cara semitransparente con controlador optico.

In 1989, she became a professor and researcher in the department of mechanical engineering at the Centro Nacional de Investigación y Desarrollo Tecnológico (CENIDET, the National Center for Research and Technological Development), in Cuernavaca. In 2014 CENIDET became part of the National Technological Institute of Mexico system.

She also served internationally in the American Society of Heating, Refrigerating and Air-Conditioning Engineers Technical Committee 4.5 on fenestration, the first Mexican to do so.

Selected publications

Recognition
Álvarez was given a national prize for renewable energy innovation by the Mexican Secretary of Energy. She was a member of the Mexican Academy of Sciences.

References

Year of birth missing
20th-century births
2017 deaths
Engineers from Mexico City
Mexican mechanical engineers
Mexican women engineers
National Autonomous University of Mexico alumni
New Mexico State University alumni
Members of the Mexican Academy of Sciences